New Hudson Ballpark is the temporary name for a proposed ballpark to be built in Hudson, Wisconsin. It is planned to be the home of the St. Croix River Hounds, a collegiate summer baseball team that will play in the Northwoods League. The new stadium will be part of a multi-use campus planned for the old 130-acre St. Croix Meadows dog track, a facility which was in business from 1991 to 2001, and which was unused afterwards. It was reported in July 2017 that construction could start the next month, with ticket sales starting that September and the stadium opening in May 2018. The St. Croix Meadows dog track was demolished in January 2018 to make room for the new Hudson Gateway development. In October 2019, baseball stadium construction was set to begin in the spring of 2020. In May 2020, construction was to begin "this summer". , ballpark construction had not begun, but the team still had "the intention to begin the build this year." In July 2022, a revised development plan was presented that would call for a 1,400 seat facility that could open as soon as June 2023. The River Hounds were still not listed in the Northwoods League schedule for 2023.

References

External links
 St. Croix River Hounds website
 Northwoods League website

Baseball venues in Wisconsin
Buildings and structures in St. Croix County, Wisconsin
Proposed stadiums in the United States